Adamchuk is a Slavic surname  derived from the given name Adam. Polish-language equivalent: Adamczuk.

People with the surname
Bronyslava Adamchuk, Ukrainian Righteous Among the Nations
Serhiy Adamchuk (born 1990), Ukrainian kickboxer
Steffan Adamchuk, Canadian curler who participated in the 2013 Canadian Junior Curling Championships
Vadym Adamchuk, Ukrainian athlete who participated in the Athletics at the 2010 Summer Youth Olympics – Boys' long jump event

See also
Nicholas Aloysius Adamschock, birth name of Nick Adams, American actor of Ukrainian origin

References

Notes

Sources
И. М. Ганжина (I. M. Ganzhina). "Словарь современных русских фамилий" (Dictionary of Modern Russian Last Names). Москва, 2001. 



Russian-language surnames
Ukrainian-language surnames